Baimajing  is a township-level division in Danzhou, Hainan, China.

See also
Baimajing railway station
Danzhou
List of township-level divisions of Hainan

References

Township-level divisions of Hainan
Danzhou